Dipeptidase 2 (DPEP2) is a protein which in humans is encoded by the DPEP2 gene.

DPEP2 belongs to the membrane-bound dipeptidase (EC 3.4.13.19) family. These enzymes hydrolyze a variety of dipeptides, including leukotriene D4, the beta-lactam ring of some antibiotics, and cystinyl-bis-glycine (cys-bis-gly) formed during glutathione degradation.

References

EC 3.4.13